Pogonomyrmecini is a tribe of myrmicine ants with 3 extant genera, recently formed in 2015.

Genera
Hylomyrma Forel, 1912
Patagonomyrmex Johnson & Moreau, 2016
Pogonomyrmex Mayr, 1868

References

Myrmicinae
Ant tribes